Ahmad Darwish was a Syrian professional footballer. He played for Syria in the editions 1980 Asian Cup and 1984 Asian Cup.

References
Statistics

Living people
Syrian footballers
1980 AFC Asian Cup players
1984 AFC Asian Cup players
Association football midfielders
Year of birth missing (living people)